Pretoriamyia is a genus of parasitic flies in the family Tachinidae.

Species
Pretoriamyia anacrostichalis Emden, 1947
Pretoriamyia munroi Curran, 1927
Pretoriamyia ogilviei Emden, 1947
Pretoriamyia plumicornis Emden, 1947
Pretoriamyia sellifera Emden, 1947
Pretoriamyia somereni Emden, 1947

References

Dexiinae
Diptera of Africa
Taxa named by Charles Howard Curran
Tachinidae genera